Joseph Bruno (born November 26, 1955) is an American politician from Maine. A Republican, Bruno served in the Maine House of Representatives from 1996 to 2004. He served two terms (2000 to 2002 and 2002 to 2004) as Minority Leader of the Maine House. He was unable to seek re-election in 2004 due to term limits and instead unsuccessfully sought election to the Maine Senate from District 12.

Personal
Bruno was born on November 26, 1955, in Flushing, New York. He grew up in Hicksville, New York in the town of Oyster Bay on Long Island. After earning a degree from Northeastern University in 1978, Bruno moved to Maine. He initially settled in Washburn, Aroostook County, where he met his wife. He eventually settled in Raymond. He earned a M.B.A. from the University of Southern Maine in 1989. He is a resident of Raymond, Maine.

References

1955 births
Living people
People from Raymond, Maine
Minority leaders of the Maine House of Representatives
Maine Republicans
People from Flushing, Queens
Politicians from New York City
People from Hicksville, New York
Northeastern University alumni
University of Southern Maine alumni
People from Aroostook County, Maine